NetSupport Manager is a Windows-centric cross-platform remote control software, allowing remote screen control and systems management from a Windows or Windows Mobile device of Windows, Mac, Linux, Solaris and Mobile devices. It was first released for DOS only networks in 1989. It supports thumbnail display of unlimited remote systems (since version 10), and allows navigation between remote systems in a manner similar to a KVM switch. Functionality includes file transfers, chat, and hardware/software inventory including software updates. Fewer features are supported for Linux and Mac clients. In 2012 NetSupport introduced new software versions allowing Remote Control from iOS and Android tablets and smartphones as well as a new Mac OS Control. Version 12 was released in October 2013, which extended platform support to include ChromeOS clients. Mobile Remote Control from iOS and Android was also extended with additional capabilities. All versions of NetSupport Manager require the pre-installation of the software on both the local (Control) and remote (Client) computers/devices prior to use.

See also
Comparison of remote desktop software

References

External links
NetSupport Manager
PCI NetSupport Manager 8 PC Pro issue 103, Apr 2003
NetSupport Manager 10 PC Pro, Jan 2007
Remote Management Made Easy Microsoft Certified Professional Magazine, Jan 2005
Remote Control: the long arm of support gets more fingers NetWork World, Jan 2007
 (March, 2010) NetSupport Manager 10.5  PC Actual
NetSupport Manager 11 PC Pro, Jul 2010
NetSupport Manager 11 Network Computing

Remote administration software